Giuliana Setari Carusi (Pescara (I), 1947) is an Italian contemporary art collector and a major figure in the international art world. After many years in Brussels, New York and Milan, she currently lives between Paris and Brussels. Together with her husband Tommaso Setari she started in the early 80s collecting contemporary art: their collection is now well known internationally. She is the founding President of the non-profit charity organization Dena Foundation for Contemporary Art.

Biography 
After a Baccalaureate in Human Sciences in Pescara (I), Giuliana Setari Carusi studied French literature and sociology at the Sorbonne University in Paris and at the Université Libre de Bruxelles, then English literature and language in London.
She graduated and became Professor in Literature and Philosophy in Italy and obtained a master's degree in European Administration Studies from the College of Europe in Bruges.

In 1979, while living in New York, Setari Carusi collaborated with exhibition projects promoting Italian artists in North American institutions such as the Art Gallery of Ontario, Toronto, the Guggenheim Museum, the P.S.1 Contemporary Art Centre and the Metropolitan Museum in New York.
Back to Italy, first in Rome in 1989, then in Milan in 1990, she co-founded Zerynthia Association for Contemporary Art, to which she actively collaborated throughout the years.

In 1998, she accompanied Italian artist Vettor Pisani in the creation of the Virginia Art Theatrum (Museum of Catastrophe) in Serre di Rapolano, nearby Siena. A homonymous book edited by Charta was later published. The same year, Michelangelo Pistoletto asked her to become President of Cittadellarte Fondazione Pistoletto in Biella(I), a position that she still holds today. She is particularly involved in Cittadellarte's movement Love Difference.

In 2000, she founded the Dena Foundation for Contemporary Art for which she serves as president, promoting emerging visual artists on the international scene: she launched a scholarships for young Italian artists at the Omi International Arts Center, in Ghent, New York, and a Residency Program for artists and curators at the Centre International d’Accueil et d’Echanges des Récollets in Paris. The foundation provides an international prize: the Dena Foundation Art Award for socially and politically engaged young artists. Among the activities of the foundation are also the conception and organization of exhibitions, rounds tables and seminaries on crucial contemporary cultural issues.

Setari Carusi has been and is member of several art institutions associations worldwide. She regularly participates in international meetings and conferences to report her experiences as a collector and professional actor of the international art scene.

In 2007, she was nominated by Il Sole 24 ore as one of the 40 Italian ambassadors of Culture in the international art world.

Three major exhibitions have been dedicated to Giuliana and Tommaso Setari's art collection: Corpus Delicti a dialogue North-South at Städelicke Museum of Ghent in Belgium in 1995, Retour à l’intime, la collection Giuliana et Tommaso Setari at the Maison Rouge foundation Antoine de Galbert/Paris in 2012 and "Intime Conviction, oeuvres de la collection de Giuliana et Tommaso Setari" at Château de Villeneuve – Fondation Emile Hugues, Vence, in 2014.

Publications 
The True Story of Monsieur E. or the importance of being silent, Cittadellarte Edizioni and The Dena Foundation for Contemporary Art, 2010

References

Articles

Coming soon the press review of the exhibition "Retour à l’intime, la collection Giuliana et Tommaso Setari" at the Maison Rouge foundation Antoine de Galbert/Paris
 Setari Carusi Giuliana, "Il y a bien une justice en ce monde", Le Quotidien de l’Art n°27, Novembre 15, 2011.
 Régnier Philippe, "L’actualité vue par Giuliana Setari Carusi", interview, Le Journal de l’Art n°339, 21 January – 3 February 2011
 Paglieri Marina, "Setari: Rivoli va difeso non-possiamo buttare un patrimonio comune", interview, La Repubblica, 6 October 2010.
 Pirelli Marinela, Mojana Marina, "I 40 italiani testimoni di cultura nel mercato dell’arte internazionale", Plus24, Il Sole 24ore, 2 November 2007.
 Massimiliano Tonelli, "Vi presento Dena", interview, Exibart.on paper n°53, November–December 2008.
 Beaux-Arts Magazine, n°275, May 2007
Judith Benhamou-Huet, "Une italienne dans le monde de l’art contemporain", Les Echos, week-end 13–14 October 2006.

Books
 Retour à l'intime, la collection Giuliana et Tommaso Setari, Ed. Fage and La maison rouge, 2012.
 Nouveaux accès, nouveaux usages à l’ère numérique: la culture pour chacun?, Actes du Forum d’Avignon, Culture, économie, médias, 4–6 November 2010, Ed. Gallimard, 2011.
 Le musée et la création contemporaine, Icône – Image – musées de Sens CEREP, Actes du 7ème colloque interdisciplianaire, 2–3 July 2010, Ed. Les Trois P. Obsidiane, 2011
 Granet Danièle, Lamour Catherine, Grands et petits secrets du monde de l’art, Ed. Fayard, 2010
 Benhamou-Huet Judith, Global Collectors, Collectionneurs du monde, Ed. Cinq Sens Phébus, 2008
 Candet Nadia, Collections particulières, 150 commandes privées d'art contemporain en France, Ed. Flammarion, 2008.
 Corpus delicti, Ed. MHK – Museum van Hedendaagse Kunst, Ghent, 1995.

Conferences/Meetings
 Round Table "Love Difference, mouvement artistique pour une politique Inter Méditerranéenne" by the Conseil Culturel de l’Union Pour la Méditerranée, KLAP of Marseille – France, 4 November 2011
 Meeting "Fondazioni culturali: modelli ed esperienze di collaborazione fra pubblico e privato" by LAC Lugano Arte e Cultura and SwissFoundations, Lugano – Switzerland, 22 September 2011
 Conference pour les Amis du CAPC, Musée d’art contemporain de Bordeaux – France, 29 June 2011
 Festival Arte Contemporanea, Forms of collecting/Forme della committenza, Faenza – Italy, 20–22 May 2011
 "Continent Méditerranée", Session of the Parlement Culturel de la Méditerranée, Marseille – France, 9–11 May 2011
 Festival della Creatività, Firenze – Italy, 21–24 October 2010
 3ème Forum d’Avignon Culture, économie, médias, Nouveaux accès, nouveaux usages à l’ère numérique: la culture pour chacun?, Avignon – France, 4–6 November 2010
 "Collezionismo e non solo: dal privato al pubblico con amore", conversation between Giuliana Setari Carusi and Marina Mojana, Pinacoteca Giovanni e Marella Agnelli, Turin – Italy, 5 October 2010
 7ème colloque interdisciplianre Icône-Image, Le musée et la création contemporaine, 2–3 July 2010, Musées de Sens – France
 Festival Arte Contemporanea, OPERE/works, Faenza – Italy, 21–23 May 2010
 Arte Fiera Bologna – Italy, 2009
 Aspettando Manifesta #3, L’economia dell’arte: una nuova economia?, Bolzano – Italy, 13 March 2008

External links
 Marina Mojana,  Giuliana Setari Carusi, Arteconomy24 ilsole24h, 2 November 2007

Italian art collectors
Women art collectors
College of Europe alumni
Living people
Art collectors from Paris
Businesspeople from New York City
People from Pescara
Year of birth missing (living people)